The Silver Antelope Award is a distinguished service award presented by the Boy Scouts of America for outstanding service to young people. From 1942 to 2021 it recognized service within one of the geographical regions of the BSA. Beginning in 2022, with a reorganization of the BSA, it is presented for service in a national service territory.

Recipients may be nominated and selected for their efforts on the national service territory committee and/or for service to the national service territory through various national committees.

The award is made by the National Court of Honor and the recipient must be a registered adult member of the Boy Scouts of America.

Award
The award consists of a silver antelope suspended from a white and orange ribbon worn around the neck. Recipients may wear the corresponding square knot, with a white strand over an orange strand, on the BSA uniform.

History
The award was created in 1942 and first issued in 1943.  An orange-white-orange ribbon bar was used for informal uniform wear until 1946, when ribbon bars were replaced by the current square knot insignia.

Using the United States Military as the model, silver awards are the highest awards in the BSA.

From the first awards in 1943 through 2022, there have been only 3,189 recipients of the Silver Antelope. The current nomination form for the award  limits the award to 32 per year and two, per year, per national service territory.

Famous recipients include Gen. William C. Westmoreland, USA 1969, Washington Governor Daniel J. Evans 1970, Texas Governor Rick Perry 2002, Philip M. Condit, CEO of Boeing 2007, Ross Perot 1974, Admiral Arleigh Burke, USN 1964, and Sanford McDonnell, CEO of McDonnell Douglas 1983.

See also 
 List of recipients of the Silver Antelope Award

References

 

Advancement and recognition in the Boy Scouts of America
Awards established in 1942